Stacey Mobley (born September 15, 1965) is a former American football wide receiver. He played for the Los Angeles Rams in 1987 and for the Detroit Lions in 1989.

References

1965 births
Living people
American football wide receivers
Jackson State Tigers football players
Los Angeles Rams players
Detroit Lions players
Birmingham Fire players
National Football League replacement players